The Hungry March Band is an American brass band with approximately 15-20 active musicians and performers. In performance, the group's size can vary from five to fifty: from a quintet to a large corps of musicians, dancers, baton twirlers, and hula hoopers. 

HMB has a repertoire of originals and traditionals that borrows from global brass band traditions, including Balkan Gypsy music, Indian wedding bands, and New Orleans second line.  The band also references punk rock; techno, hip hop; various jazz traditions, including free jazz and bop; reggae; and chance music.  They cite Sun Ra, Charlie Parker, John Cage, the Shyam Brass Band, Fanfare Ciocarlia, Rebirth Brass Band, the Skatalites, Sonic Youth, Weird Al Yankovic, and Black Sabbath as influences.

History 
The Hungry March Band was formed in 1997 at the Happy Birthday Hideout for the purpose of performing in the Coney Island Mermaid Parade.  Some early members were Scott Moore on sousaphone, Cuzn Johnny, Dreiky Caprice, Tim Hoey, Darius 'Boom Boom' Macrum, Noah on percussion, Theresa Westerdahl aka Tara Fire Ball on clarinet, Gam Mitkevich on trombone, and Sara Valentine as baton twirler. Sasha Sumner, Sebastian Isler, Atsushi Tsamura, Emily Fairey, Okkon Tomohiko, Greg Squared, Ben Meyers, and Jason Candler all joined the band during the early period, before 2001.

Performances 
Part of the attraction for band members, spectators, and participants alike is the band's ability to move anywhere relatively quickly without need of electricity or artificial amplification.  They have attracted attention with performances in unlikely locations, including subway trains, the Staten Island Ferry, and unannounced street events.  They have also played numerous outdoor festivals in New York and around Europe, various protest marches, at Rubulad and Gemini & Scorpio events in Brooklyn, and annually in Boston, Massachusetts (and Providence, RI) at the HONK! Festival in Somerville, Massachusetts.  Around New York City, they have performed at Lincoln Center and countless clubs throughout the five boroughs. 

Notable gigs and tours:
2000: Madison Square Garden during one of Ralph Nader's rallies during his 2000 bid for the presidency of the United States which included a march to the steps of the main branch of the USPS to deliver voter registrations. 
2000: 24-Hour Tom Waits Festival near Poughkeepsie, New York
2001: Mummer's Parade in Philadelphia, Pennsylvania
2004: Summer European Tour (Italy, Germany, Switzerland, Netherlands)
2005: Mardi Gras, New Orleans, Louisiana
2005: Summer European Tour (Italy, France)
2006: Summer European Tour (Germany, Italy) 
2007: Summer European Tour (Germany, Spain, France) 
2009: Summer Tour in France, Sant'Anna Arresi Jazz Festival, Sardinia, Italy 
In 2010, their concert from the 2009 Sant'Anna Arresi Jazz Festival in Sardinia was broadcast on Radio3 throughout Italy. 
On May 27, 2010, their performance of Conduction No. 188 under the baton of Butch Morris was also broadcast nationally throughout Italy. 
2010: West coast US Tour
2012: XIII Festival Iberioamericano de Teatro, Bogota, Colombia

2015: Summer European Tour (England, France)

2016: Le Festif de Baie-St-Paul, Québec, Canada

The band also makes an appearance in John Cameron Mitchell's 2006 movie Shortbus.

Discography
Running Through with the Sadness (2018)Live at the Sant'Anna Arresi Jazz Festival (2009)Suspicious Package (Roll Out the Poncho) EP (2008)Portable Soundtracks for Temporary Utopias (2007)Critical Brass (2005)On the Waterfront (2002)Hungry March Band Official Bootleg (2000)

Running Through with the Sadness
Recorded over the course of four years, this album was produced and recorded by HMB member Jason Candler.  It is composed entirely of original material written by band members, the cover art is by HMB member John Heyenga, and is the first album by HMB to be released on LP format.  Basis tracks were recorded at Galapagos Art Space in DUMBO, Brooklyn, and the rest of the production was handled at the Maid's Room, Lower East Side.

Portable Soundtracks for Temporary Utopias
Recorded in March 2007 at The Hook in Red Hook, Brooklyn, this CD was produced by Danny Blume, Matt Moran and the Hungry March Band, and mastered by Scott Hull. HMB member Jason Candler provided additional production.   It almost exclusively comprises original material written by band members, and the cover art is by Samantha Tsistinas with design work by Julie Hair, both of whom are percussionists in the band.

Critical Brass
This CD was recorded at LOHO Studios on Clinton Street on Manhattan's Lower East Side a few weeks after the Hungry March Band returned from its first European tour.  In a similar style to On the Waterfront, the entire thing was recorded live, but this time with many well-placed microphones, and in a more controlled sound environment.  It was produced by Jason Candler and the Hungry March Band, recorded by Joe Hogan, and contains cover art by Troy Frantz.

On the Waterfront
On the Waterfront was recorded in two sessions in 2001 with the entire band playing live into two microphones (one for the bass drum and one for the band at large).  It was recorded in a loft apartment in Williamsburg, Brooklyn by John Gurrin and edited by HMB member Jason Candler.  The cover art is by East Village artist Fly.  This disc is named after and dedicated to the vacant lot on the East River in Brooklyn where the band used to rehearse and to which it attributes its miraculous rebirth.

Official Bootleg
The first Hungry March Band CD is a fairly accurate reflection of what the band was doing for the first few years of its existence.  Several tracks were recorded at the now-defunct Rubulad art space in Williamsburg, Brooklyn in the fall of 1999, but most of them were culled from field recordings made by band members.  The opening track, Disco Bhangra, was recorded at the Ship's Mast bar on Kent Avenue.

Most of the material was improvised based on loose structural ideas that were conceived by sousaphonist Scott Moore, and designed to allow for maximum improvisation and spontaneity. The CD arrangement was completed by Ben Meyers & Scott Moore.

Related performance projects
The following is an incomplete list of other musical and theatrical projects that involve or have involved members of the Hungry March Band:

Ram Umbus (Scott Moore, John Lewis)
Crash Worship (Dreiky Caprice)
Nimble One Minded Animals Here (Scott Moore)
Sink Manhattan (Scott Moore)
THRUST(Tara Fire Ball) 
Tung Fa Lupa (Tara Fire Ball, Tim Hoey)
Female Bureau of Investigation (Sasha Sumner)
Live Skull (Julie Hair, Rich Hutchins >< RICH HUTCHINS >)
Of Cabbages and Kings (Rich Hutchins >< RICH HUTCHINS >)
Digitalis (Julie Hair, Rich Hutchins >< RICH HUTCHINS >)
Ruin... (Rich Hutchins >< RICH HUTCHINS >)
3 Teens Kill 4 (Julie Hair)
Bite Like A Kitty (Julie Hair)
Guarsh (Jason Candler)G U A R S H
The University of Iowa Hawkeye Marching Band (John Barker)
The Bleeding Reeds (Emily Fairey, Greg Squared, Jason Candler, Okkon Yokoyama)
The Bindlestiff Family Circus (Ben Meyers, Tim Hoey, Kris Anton)Main
Torch Job (Samantha Tsistinas, Tara Fire Ball)Torch Job
Scorchers (Dee Jay Mush One, Ben Shanley)///////////////// The Scorchers - Brooklyn Ska ///////////////
Fireproof (Ben Shanley, Anders Nelson, Dee Jay Mush One)Circus Amok (Ben Meyers)Circus Amok!
Little Miss Big Mouth (Sara Valentine, Rich Hutchins >< RICH HUTCHINS >)
Neues Kabarett (Urania Mylonas)
Juliet Echo (Jen Emma, Rich Hutchins >< RICH HUTCHINS >)
Jollyship the Whiz-Bang (Tim Hoey, Kris Anton)
Reverend Billy and the Church of Stop Shopping (Sasha Sumner, Urania Mylonas)Reverend Billy and the Stop Shopping Choir | Reverend Billy and the Stop Shopping Choir
Gary Lucas & Gods and Monsters (Jason Candler)Gary Lucas - Official Website
Earth People (Jason Candler)Earth People
Gelcaps/Millbrook Falls/The Lids(Doug Anson, Gam)
Guitar Trips  Golden Haze Society | Listen and Stream Free Music, Albums, New Releases, Photos, Videos (Doug Anson)
Doug Douglas and the Road Agents(Doug Anson)
The Woes (Joe Keady)the woes
Zagnuts Cirkus Orchestra (Greg Squared)Zagnut Cirkus (Circus) Orkestar - The Band
Rude Mechanical Orchestra (Michele Hardesty, Joe Keady, Ben Meyers, Rich Hutchins >< RICH HUTCHINS >, Quince Marcum, Julie Hair, Jean Loscalzo)Rude Mechanical Orchestra
Veveritse (JR Hankins, Don Godwin, Joe Keady, Greg Squared, Emily Geller, Quince Marcum, Sarah Ibrahim)
Stagger Back Brass Band (Michele Hardesty, Quince Marcum, Joe Keady, Don Godwin, Greg Squared, JR Hankins)
The Red Hook Ramblers (Joe Keady)
Squeezebox (Joe Keady)
Phideaux (Rich Hutchins >< RICH HUTCHINS >, Julie Hair) Phideaux)
Lubricated Goat (Rich Hutchins >< RICH HUTCHINS >)
Minor Mishap Marching Band (Adam Loudermilk)
o'death (David Rogers-Berry)O"Death – Out of Hands We Go
Raya Brass Band (Greg Squared, Don Godwin)

References
Shortbus - film by John Cameron Mitchell - appearance and music
La “Hungry March Band” da New York al Poco Loco di Alghero
The Rise of Gypsy Punkers - by Ben Sisario- NY Times - July 2, 2005
The Hungry March Band are metal heads of another sort - by Brooke Edwards - The Villager -Volume 76, Number 4 February 28 - March 6, 2007
Playing Oompah In the Key Of Whatever; A Brooklyn Band Marches To a Different Sousaphone- by Andy Newman - NY Times - June 29, 2000
Hunger Force: Brooklyn’s own Hungry March Band heads up a spitvalve triptych of highly mobile musical units, late Saturday night in and around the Asbury Lanes.
 In Netflix series Orange Is the New Black, season 1, episode 10, the characters Piper and Larry talk about going to a Hungry March Band show

External links
 Official Website
 Facebook Page
 Live radio performance on WFMU

American marching bands
Gypsy punk groups
American brass bands
Musical groups established in 1997